Grubby Hands Limited is an independent games studio, best known for the mobile game David Haye’s Knockout. It is among the five most recent companies that were started by former staff members of Bizarre Creations, following the studio's closure in 2011.

History 

In February 2011, Activision, the owners of Bizarre Creations, decided to close the studio, prompting several former staff members to set up their own separate development companies of varying sizes. Danny Pearce, Bizarre Creations' former senior programmer, founded Grubby Hands in May 2011.

Games

David Haye's Knockout 
David Haye’s Knockout was made in association with David Haye, the former heavyweight champion whom the game is named after. The game was released in conjunction with Hayes heavyweight unification title fight with Wladimir Klitschko in Hamburg. The iPhone game caused much controversy within the press, specifically for the ability of the player to punch their opponent hard enough to decapitate them.
On 10 June 2011, Grubby Hands' released their first game David Hayes Knockout on the iPhone, iPad and iPod touch.

On its first release David Haye’s Knockout immediately topped the iPhone App Store Charts: reaching #1 in the Sports Chart, #3 in the Action Chart, #5 in the Games Chart and #8 in the App Chart.

On 18 May 2012, Grubby Hands re-released an updated version of David Hayes Knockout. Within a week of releasing David Haye’ Knockout'.'

Following a re-release and redesigned update for David Hayes Knockout on 18 May 2012, Grubby Hands released a second David Haye game in December 2012. David Hayes Jungle Rumble, which went immediately to the top of the charts.

 Boy Loves Girl 
On 1 August 2011, Grubby Hands started developing their second iPhone game Boy Loves Girl'' with its eventual release on 21 December 2011.

Interview
 Bizarre Creations: iOS Developers Risen From The Flames
 Where Are All The British Games?
 Interview: Grubby Hands Talks Sequels, David Haye and more...
 Business and Love
 Interview with Grubby Hands Company Director, Dr Danny Pearce

References

External links 
 Official Website
 Grubby Hands Facebook
 Grubby Hands Twitter
 David Haye's Official Website

Video game development companies
Video game companies of the United Kingdom